The Raisner Graffiti is an American ultralight trike that was designed by Bill Raisner and produced by Raisner Aircraft Depot, a division of Leading Edge Air Foils of Peyton, Colorado and introduced about 1997. When it was available the aircraft was supplied as a kit for amateur construction.

By 2014 the aircraft was no longer offered for sale by Leading Edge Air Foils.

Design and development
The Graffiti was designed with the goals of maximizing safety, performance and simplicity of construction. It was intended to comply with the US FAR 103 Ultralight Vehicles rules, as a two-seat trainer. It features a cable-braced hang glider-style high-wing, weight-shift controls, a two-seats-in-tandem open cockpit with a cockpit fairing, tricycle landing gear with wheel pants and a single engine in pusher configuration.

The aircraft is made from bolted-together aluminum tubing, with its double surface wing covered in Dacron sailcloth.

Specifications (Graffiti)

References

1990s United States sport aircraft
1990s United States ultralight aircraft
Homebuilt aircraft
Single-engined pusher aircraft
Ultralight trikes
Leading Edge Air Foils aircraft